Penicillium infrapurpureum is a species of the genus of Penicillium.

References

infrapurpureum
Fungi described in 2014